Sarah is a station on the Port Authority of Allegheny County's light rail network, located in Bethel Park, Pennsylvania. The street level stop is designed as a small commuter stop, serving area residents who walk to the train so they can be taken toward Downtown Pittsburgh.

References

External links 

Station from Sarah Street from Google Maps Street View

Port Authority of Allegheny County stations
Railway stations in the United States opened in 1987
Silver Line (Pittsburgh)